Valeri Sergeevich Zolotukhin (21 June 1941 – 30 March 2013) was a Soviet and Russian stage and cinema actor who performed at the Taganka Theatre which he also headed between 2011 and 2013. He was named People's Artist of the RSFSR in 1987.

Biography
Zolotukhin was born in the Bystry Istok village (modern-day Bystroistoksky District of the Altai Krai, Russia) into a peasant family just one day before the Great Patriotic War started. He was one of the three sons of Sergei Illarionovich Zolotukhin, the head of the local kolkhoz who left for the frontline the next day. Valeri spent war years with his mother Matryona Fedoseyevna Zolotukhina. At the age of seven he survived osteomyelitis of one of his legs, spent three years in bed and had to learn to walk again. He remained lame by the time he decided to enter a theatre institute and had to hide it.

In 1963 Zolothukhin graduated from the Russian Academy of Theatre Arts, the faculty of musical theater, and entered the Mossovet Theatre where he served for a year. In 1964 he moved to the newly established Taganka Theatre under Yuri Lyubimov where he spent the rest 50 years, taking part in many plays. He was a close friend of Vladimir Vysotsky and regularly performed alongside him, both on stage and in movies. He later published several books of memoirs about their friendship and Taganka Theatre in general.

In 1965 Zolothukhin appeared in his first movie Package based on the children's novel by L. Panteleyev, in the leading part of a goofy Red Army soldier. In 1966 the film won Grand Prix at the Zlatá Praha International Television Festival (Czechoslovakia). But real fame came to Zolothukhin only in 1971 after the Bumbarash TV movie where he played a similar goofy soldier. The actor has been closely associated with the Bumbarash character ever since.

In addition to acting Zolotukhin also performed as a singer, wrote stories and read them from stage. He remained at the Taganka Theatre after the 1993 split, when a number of actors headed by Nikolai Gubenko left it following Lyubimov's plans to privatize the theatre and move to the contract system.

In 2007 he took part in the 5th State Duma elections as A Just Russia candidate, heading the Perm Krai regional group. After winning the race he passed his mandate to another party member Konstantin Beschetnov and left politics.

In 2010 another internal conflict happened, also caused by Lyubimov's decision to move to a contract system. Finally he left the theatre, and the remaining actors chose Zolotukhin as the head of Taganka despite his health problems. He still managed the theatre both as a managing and artistic director and, according to Gubenko, released five or six new plays.

On 5 March 2013 it was reported that Zolotukhin had been taken to the intensive care unit due to unknown illness. RBK mentioned that he had already resigned from his post and basically hadn't been working since December 2012 following his first hospitalization. He was later diagnosed with brain tumor.

Valeri Zolotukhin died on 30 March aged 71. In accordance with his will, he was buried in his native village Bystry Istok at the Altai Krai, on the territory of the Russian Orthodox church which he had built.

He was survived by his second wife, a violinist Tatiana Zolotukhina, his son from the first marriage to an actress Nina Shatskaya – Denis (b. 1969), an Orthodox priest, and Ivan (b. 2004) — his late son from an actress Irina Lindt. His only son from the second marriage, Sergei (b. 1979), committed suicide at the age of 27.

Partial filmography

 Package (1965) — Petka Trofimov
 Intervention (1967) — Evgeny Xydias
 The Master of Taiga (1968) — Detective Vasili Snezhkin
 Late Flowers (1970) — knyaz Yegorushka
 The Flight (1970) — singer
 Beg (1971) — Pevets
 Hail, Mary! (1971) — Nestor Makhno
 The Twelve Chairs (1971) — vocal (voice)
 Salyut, Mariya! (1971) — Nestor Makhno
 Bumbarash (1972, TV Movie) — Bumbarash
 Ivan Vasilievich: Back to the Future (1973) — George Miloslavsky (singing voice, uncredited)
 Berega (1973)
 O tekh, kogo pomnyu i lyublyu (1974) — Yegor Vasilyev
 Kazhdyy den doktora Kalinnikovoy (1974) — Bybikov
 For the Rest of His Life (1975, TV Mini-Series) — uncle Sasha
 Edinstvennaya (1976) — Kolya Kasatkin
 How Czar Peter the Great Married Off His Moor (1976) — Filka
 Smeshnye lyudi! (1977)
 Zavyalovskiye chudiki (1978) — (segment "Versiya")
 Predvaritelnoe rassledovanie (1978)
 Little Tragedies (1980, TV Mini-Series) — Mozart
 Taynoe golosovanie (1980) — Ivan Fomich
 Yabloko na ladoni (1981)
 Detskiy mir (1982)
 Charodei (1982) — Ivan Kivrin
 Treasure Island (1982, TV Movie) — Ben Gunn
 Mother Mary (1982) — captive
 Sred bela dnya (1983)
 Demidovy (1984) — Panteley
 Dead Souls (1984, TV Mini-Series) — postmaster Ivan Andreevich / captain Kopeikin
 I vot prishyol Bumbo... (1984)
 Man with an Accordion (1985)
 Tri protsenta riska (1985)
 Chicherin (1986)
 Zakhochu - polyublyu (1990)
 Govoryashchaya obezyana (1991)
 Oy, rebyata, ta-ra-ra (1992) — (voice)
 Kak zhivyote, karasi? (1992) — Blagorodnyj karas
 Okhlamon (1993)
 The Life and Extraordinary Adventures of Private Ivan Chonkin (1994) — Kilin
 Don't Play the Fool (1997) — Ivan Tarataikin
 Night Watch (2004) — Kostya's father
 Nochnoy bazar (2005)
 Adjutants of Love (2005, TV Series) — Alexander Suvorov
 The Master and Margarita (2005, TV Mini-Series) — Nikanor Bosoy
 Brezhnev (2005, TV Series) — Igor the gamekeeper
 Deadly Force 6 (2005, TV Series) — Yuri Danilov
 Ptitsy nebesnye (2005) — Feliks
 Not Born Beautiful (2005–2006, TV Series) — taxi driver
 Day Watch (2006) — Kostya's father
 1612 (2007) — stylite
 Black Lightning (2009) — Pavel Perepyolkin the inventor
 Burnt by the Sun 2 (2010) — Pindurin the barge captain
 Iron Lord (2010) — Churila
 Pyat nevest (2011) — Dedasya
 Rzhevskiy protiv Napoleona (2012) — Suvorov
 Brigada: Naslednik (2012) — Swede
 Viy (2014) — Yavtukh (final film role)

References

External links

1941 births
2013 deaths
20th-century Russian male actors
21st-century Russian male actors
Honored Artists of the RSFSR
People from Altai Krai
People's Artists of the RSFSR
Russian Academy of Theatre Arts alumni
Russian male actors
Russian male short story writers
Russian male voice actors
Russian memoirists
Russian theatre directors
Soviet male actors
Soviet male singers
Soviet male voice actors
Soviet male writers
Deaths from brain cancer in Russia
20th-century Russian male singers
20th-century Russian singers